Beccles railway station is on the East Suffolk Line in the east of England, serving the town of Beccles, Suffolk. Its three-letter station code is BCC.

It is managed by Abellio Greater Anglia, which also operates all trains that call.

History
The Beccles to Lowestoft line opened in the same year.

The Waveney Valley Line closed to passengers in 1954 and the Yarmouth-Beccles Line closed to passengers in 1959. The Waveney Valley Line was then closed to freight traffic in 1963. The engine shed was demolished in 2006.

Passing loop development
Work began in early 2010 to develop a passing loop at Beccles to allow services to operate hourly on the single-track line. The lack of a double-track to allow trains to pass north of  had previously made this frequency of service impossible.

By March 2010, the single track at Beccles was renewed with continuously welded rail and concrete sleepers. The track was also realigned from the southern approach to the station to allow room for the loop. The old track was lifted and placed alongside the disused platform and disposed of in late 2010. By March 2012, work had started to build the passing loop and, by May of that year, new turnout points were in place and work had begun on redeveloping the disused island platform. The old trackbed had also been removed.

Work was completed by December 2012 and enhanced services began on 10 December 2012. The £4 million scheme was jointly funded by Network Rail and Suffolk County Council.

Facilities 
There is a café in the original station building adjoining the Lowestoft-bound platform.

There is a footbridge with quite steep ramps connecting the platforms, and passenger information screens on both platforms.

Services
 the typical Monday-Saturday off-peak service at Beccles is as follows:

On Sundays frequency reduces to one train every two hours in each direction. Trains direct to and from London Liverpool Street were withdrawn in 2010.

References

External links 

Railway stations in Suffolk
DfT Category F1 stations
Former Great Eastern Railway stations
Railway stations in Great Britain opened in 1854
Greater Anglia franchise railway stations
1854 establishments in England
Beccles